Arjunwad is a village in Belagavi district in the Northern  state of Karnataka, India.

Transport
From Mumbai and Pune, take NH4 national highway to Peth by the state highway 138 to Sangli. Then travel by state highway SH75 from Sangli to Arjunwad. Arjunwad is 15 km from Sangli city.

Nearest railway junction

Miraj - 4 km
Miraj railway station is connected to major cities by express and super fast trains. You can take MSRTC city buses, auto rickshaws and private cars from Miraj to Arjunwad. Travel time is 15–20 minutes.

Other railway stations

Sangli - 14 km,
Jaysingpur - 7 km
Narsobawadi - 10 km

Express trains traveling on Pune-Miraj-Bangalore main line stop at Miraj railway station. One can take MSRTC city buses, auto rickshaws and private cars from Miraj to Arjunwad. Travel time is 15–20 minutes.

References

Geography of Aurangabad, Maharashtra
Villages in Belagavi district